Ardico Magnini (21 October 1928 – 3 July 2020) was an Italian footballer who played as a defender.

Club career
Along with Sergio Cervato, Magnini formed the defensive partnership of Fulvio Bernardini's Fiorentina back-line. After winning the championship with the club in 1956, he played another two seasons in Florence before going to Genoa, and finished his career at Prato in Serie B.

International career
After Giampiero Boniperti, Ardico Magnini, along with club team mates Cervato, Egisto Pandolfini and Armando Segato, is one of five 'Azzurri' with the most caps for the national team during the difficult rebuilding years of the fifties, following the Superga air disaster in 1949. He made two appearances at the 1954 World Cup with Italy, and 20 in total between 1953 and 1957.

References
 La Gazzetta dello Sport

1928 births
2020 deaths
Italian footballers
Association football defenders
U.S. Pistoiese 1921 players
ACF Fiorentina players
Genoa C.F.C. players
A.C. Prato players
Serie A players
Serie B players
Italy international footballers
1954 FIFA World Cup players